Julius Sawe Kipkoech (born 21 November 1971) is a Kenyan racewalker. He competed in the men's 20 kilometres walk at the 1996 Summer Olympics and the 2000 Summer Olympics.

References

External links
 

1971 births
Living people
Athletes (track and field) at the 1996 Summer Olympics
Athletes (track and field) at the 2000 Summer Olympics
Kenyan male racewalkers
Olympic athletes of Kenya
Place of birth missing (living people)
Athletes (track and field) at the 1998 Commonwealth Games
20th-century Kenyan people